Vaughan City Council is the lower-tier municipal governing body for the city of Vaughan, Ontario.  It is a part of the upper-tier Regional Municipality of York.  Members of the council are elected in three categories: wards councillors, citywide councillors, and a mayor.  The wards have remained consistent since the 2010 election.

Council positions

Mayor

Local and regional councillor
Also known as simply regional councillors, anyone filling this position not only serves the people's interest on the Vaughan City Council, they are also responsible for representing the city at the York Regional Council.  The regional councillor who receives the most votes in an election is also made the deputy mayor, whose role is to represent the mayor in their absence.  For the extra work they do, the deputy mayor receives a 10% higher salary compared to a councillor.

Ward councillors

Current council

Vaughan City Hall

City council and various civic offices are housed at the Civic Centre which was built by Kubawara, Payne, McKenna and Blumberg and opened in 2011.

Besides the main City Hall building, the complex features:

 Civic Tower with clock
 Chamber of Commerce Building
 Public library building 
 Civic Square, Market and Cenotaph 
 reflecting pool/skating rink
 public gardens and naturalized park

Previous civic buildings:

 Township Hall in Vellore on Lot 20 in Concession 5 (present day Weston Road between Rutherford Road and Major Mackenzie Drive) 1845-1943
 Township Hall at northeast corner of Major Mackenzie Drive and Keele Street 1943-1957
 2141 Major Mackenzie Drive 1957-2011 (renovation in 1982)

Previous councils

Township of Vaughan

Town of Vaughan
1971 to 1983

1983 to 1991

City of Vaughan
1991 to 1994

1994 to 2002

2002 to 2010

2010 to 2022

2022 to present

Notes

Controversy 
Following the November 2006 election, former mayor Michael Di Biase appealed the results of the elections citing possible errors in the ballot counting machines. The results were reviewed following a decision in his favour in Ontario Superior Court, concluding that the original result, the election of Jackson as mayor, was the correct one.

Mayors 
The head of City Council is the mayor. A list of mayors and reeves of Vaughan includes:

Reeves
 Garnett A. Williams 1969-1970
 Brian Bailey 1967-1968
 Albert H. Rutherford 1961-1966
 John W. Perry 1957-1960
 Marshall McMurchy 1952-1956
 John Hostrawer 1949-1951
 Boynton Weldrick 1944-1948
 Robert W. Scott 1936-1943
 George Kellam 1931-1935
 James Henry Robson 1929-1930
 Henry Kellam 1928
 George Kellam 1927
 Thomas B. Weldrick 1925-1926
 John T. Saigeon 1922-1924
 John Whitmore 1917-1921
 Scott McNair 1915-1916
 James A. Cameron 1911-1914
 Daniel Longhouse 1909-1910
 Isaac Devins 1907-1908
 John Boyle 1905-1906
 William Watson 1903-1904
 James H. Kirby 1901-1902
 Alexander Bryson 1898-1900
 Samuel Arnold 1897
 George High 1894-1896
 Andrew Russell 1890-1893
 James McNeil 1889
 Alexander Malloy 1887-1888
 Thompson Porter 1881-1886
 William C. Patterson 1874-1880
 David Boyle 1872-1873
 Peter Patterson 1868–1871
 Henry S. Howland 1864-1867
 Robert J. Arnold 1861-1863
 Henry S. Howland 1859-1860
 David Bridgeford 1858
 John W. Gamble 1850-1857 first reeve of the Township

Acting/Deputy Mayors 

The position of Deputy Mayor (earlier called Acting Mayor) is based on the councillor receiving the greatest number of votes in a municipal election, and has included:

Deputy Reeves'
 Garnet A. Williams 1965-1968
 Jesse Bryson 1961-1964
 Victor B. Ryder 1959-1960
 Robert A. Kirk 1957-1958
 Albert H. Rutherford 1952–1956, 1969-1970
 Marshall McMurchy 1949-1951
 John Hostrawser 1944-1948
 Boynton Weldrick 1936-1943
 Robert W. Scott 1935
 Robert Dooks 1931-1934
 Thomas Baker 1929-1930
 Arthur Farr 1927-1928 
 James Henry Robson 1925-1928
 Thomas B. Weldrick 1922-1924
 George Kellam 1922-1926
 William O. McDonald 1921
 Walter Anderson 1919-1920
 John T. Saigeon 1917–1918, 1921, 1929-1931
 John Whitmore 1915-1916
 Scott McNair 1911-1914
 James A. Cameron 1909-1910
 Daniel Longhouse 1907-1908
 William Watson 1898
 James H. Kirby 1897-1898
 Alexander Bryson 1894-1897
 Samuel Arnold 1890-1896
 George High 1887-1893
 Andrew Russell 1887-1889
 Isaac Reaman 1886-1888
 George Elliott 1886
 Alexander Malloy 1884-1886
 Thomas Webster 1882-1883
 William Cook 1881-1885
 Damiel Reaman 1879-1885
 Isaac Nattress 1879-1881
 John L. Card 1878, 1880
 Daniel Kinnee 1877-1878
 Isaac Chapman 1875-1876
 N. Clarke Wallace 1874-1879
 Thomas Webster 1872-1877
 Thompson Porter 1871-1873
 David Boyle 1870-1871
 William Hartman 1868-1869
 Robert J. Arnold 1867-1870
 Thomas Grahame 1865-1867
 William Cook 1861, 1863
 Alfred Jeffery 1858–1860, 1862, 1864
 David Smellie 1851-1853

References

External links 
Members of the Council at the City of Vaughan website
Ward and councillor area map

Municipal councils in Ontario
Politics of Vaughan